Cochiti Lake is a census-designated place  in Sandoval County, New Mexico, United States. Its population was 569 as of the 2010 census.

Demographics

Education
It is in the Bernalillo Public Schools district, which operates Cochiti Elementary and Middle Schools in Peña Blanca (the zoned elementary and middle school for this community), and Bernalillo High School.

References

Census-designated places in New Mexico
Census-designated places in Sandoval County, New Mexico